GrammaTech is a software-development tools vendor based in Bethesda, Maryland with a research center based in Ithaca, New York. The company was founded in 1988 as a technology spin-off of Cornell University. GrammaTech is a provider of application security testing products (static application security testing, Software Composition Analysis) and software research services.

Products
CodeSonar is a source code and binary code static analysis tool that performs a whole-program, interprocedural analysis on C, C++, C#, Java, and binary executables. It identifies programming bugs and security vulnerabilities in software.  CodeSonar is used in the Defense/Aerospace, Medical, Industrial Control, Electronic, Telecom/Datacom and Transportation industries. The U.S. Food and Drug Administration (FDA) Center for Devices and Radiological Health uses it to detect defects in fielded medical devices.
The U.S. National Highway Traffic Safety Administration (NHTSA) and NASA used it in its Study on Sudden Unintended Acceleration
in the electronic throttle control systems of Toyota vehicles.

CodeSentry is derived from GrammaTech’s binary code analysis research. This technology performs deep analysis of object, library and executable files without the need for source code in order to identify known software security vulnerabilities.  Binary analysis is an efficient method for software composition analysis with high precision and recall results and fewer false positives.

Research
GrammaTech's research division undertakes projects for private contractors, including several U.S. government agencies, such as NASA, the NSF, and many branches of the Department of Defense. GrammaTech's research is focused on both static analysis and dynamic analysis, on both source code and binaries.

GrammaTech participated and came in 2nd place in DARPA's 2016 Cyber Grand Challenge, earning $1 million as Team TECHx. GrammaTech led Team TECHx, a collaboration with the University of Virginia, using their co-developed cyber-reasoning system called Xandra.

History

GrammaTech is a 1988 spin-off from Cornell University, where its founders had developed an early Integrated Development Environment in 1978  (the Cornell Program Synthesizer) and a system for generating language-based environments from attribute-grammar specifications in 1982 (the Synthesizer Generator). Commercial systems that have been implemented using the Synthesizer Generator include ORA's Ada verification system 
(Penelope),
Terma's Rigorous Approach to Industrial Software Engineering
(Raise),
and Loral's checker of the SPC Quality and Style Guidelines for Ada.
GrammaTech co-founders Tom Reps and Tim Teitelbaum received the 2010
ACM SIGSOFT 
Retrospective Impact Award 
for their work on the Synthesizer Generator.

GrammaTech commercialized the Wisconsin Program-Slicing Tool as CodeSurfer for C and C++ in 1999. CodeSonar for C and C++, a static analysis tool, has been available since 2005. GrammaTech co-founder Reps and two other company affiliates shared in a 2011 ACM SIGSOFT 
Retrospective Impact Award 
for their paper describing the Wisconsin slicing research.

GrammaTech and the University of Wisconsin have been collaborating since 2001 to develop analysis, reverse-engineering, and anti-tamper tools for binary executables. Byproducts of this research are CodeSurfer/x86 (a version of CodeSurfer for the Intel x86 instruction set), CodeSonar/x86 (a bug and vulnerability finding tool for stripped executables), and an approach to creating such systems automatically from formal semantic descriptions of arbitrary instruction set architectures.
This research was later commercialized into CodeSonar for Binaries and CodeSentry, a software composition analysis tool.

In 2019, GrammaTech was acquired by Five Points Capital.

References

External links

Static program analysis tools
Software companies based in New York (state)
Software companies of the United States